Nizhnelebyazhye is a rural locality (a selo) in Raznochinovsky Selsoviet, Narimanovsky District, Astrakhan Oblast, Russia. The population was 225 as of 2010. There are 4 streets.

Geography 
Nizhnelebyazhye is located on the Volga River, 95 km east of Narimanov (the district's administrative centre) by road. Narimanov is the nearest rural locality.

References 

Rural localities in Narimanovsky District